Amphoriscus is a genus of calcareous sponges in the family Amphoriscidae.

Species
 Amphoriscus ancora Van Soest, 2017
 Amphoriscus buccichii Ebner, 1887
 Amphoriscus chrysalis (Schmidt, 1864)
 Amphoriscus cyathiscus Haeckel, 1870
 Amphoriscus cylindrus (Haeckel, 1872)
 Amphoriscus dohrni Sarà, 1960
 Amphoriscus elongatus Poléjaeff, 1883
 Amphoriscus gastrorhabdifer (Burton, 1932)
 Amphoriscus gregorii (Lendenfeld, 1891)
 Amphoriscus kryptoraphis Urban, 1908
 Amphoriscus oviparus (Haeckel, 1872)
 Amphoriscus pedunculatus Klautau, Cavalcanti & Borojevic, 2017
 Amphoriscus salfii Sarà, 1951
 Amphoriscus semoni Breitfuss, 1896
 Amphoriscus synapta (Schmidt in Haeckel, 1872)
 Amphoriscus testiparus (Haeckel, 1872)
 Amphoriscus urna Haeckel, 1872

References

Leucosolenida
Taxa named by Ernst Haeckel